Indonesian Aerospace (IAe), is an Indonesian aerospace company involved in aircraft design and the development and manufacture of civilian and military regional commuter aircraft. It was expanded from a research and industrial facility under the auspices of the Indonesian Air Force, namely  or Nurtanio Aviation Industry Institute.

Established in 1976 as a state owned company, it has developed its capability as an aircraft manufacturer and diversified into other areas, such as telecommunication, automotive, maritime, information technology, oil & gas, control & automation, military, simulation technology, industrial turbine, and engineering services.

History

Pioneering 

Though aircraft production in Indonesia existed before independence in 1945, the National Aviation Industry was pioneered in 1946 at Yogyakarta by the formation of Planning and Construction Bureau within the Indonesian Air Force. Wiweko Soepono, Nurtanio Pringgoadisurjo, and J. Sumarsono, opened a simple workshop at Magetan, near Madiun. With basic materials, gliders were designed and built – Zogling, NWG-1 (Nurtanio Wiweko Glider) among others.

In 1948, a motorised aircraft, WEL-X was built by Wiweko Soepono using a Harley Davidson engine. The small craft was registered as RI-X. This era marked the rise of several aeromodelling clubs.

The war for independence, however, halted all progress until 1953. In that year, The Experimental Section was organised. Consisting of only 15 personnel, led by Nurtanio Pringgoadisurjo, The team built and tested three prototypes of a single-seat all metal aircraft at Andir Airport (Later renamed Husein Sastranegara International Airport) in Bandung.

On 24 April 1957, The Experimental Section graduated into The Inspection, Trial, and Production Sub-Depot based on Decision Letter of Indonesian Air Force Chief of Staff number 68.

In 1958, a light training aircraft prototype named Belalang 89, or Grasshopper 89, was flown. Five  were built and used for military training. Within the same year, a sport plane, "Kunang 25", was also built and flown.

Preparation 
On 1 August 1960, by the order of the Chief of Staff of the Indonesian Air Force (order #488), The Aviation Industry Preparation Agency was to be formed to establish the Indonesian aviation industry as part of national strategies on national industrial production. By 16 December 1961, the new body, known as LAPIP, was actively negotiating for technological transfers and contracts.

LAPIP was able to secure a joint licensing and production contract with Poland.

In 1965, the Aircraft Industry Project Implementation Command and the Independent Aircraft Industry National Company were formed to expand and formulate specific uses of the young aviation industry.

Within the same timeline, Aviation Studies were promoted in the country's top universities. One of the first schools was founded within the machine department of the engineering faculty of the Bandung Institute of Technology by Oetarjo Diran and Liem Keng Kie.

In September 1974, Pertamina's Advanced Technology Division signed a license contract with MBB and CASA for producing Bölkow Bo 105 and CASA C.212 Aviocar.

Nurtanio Aircraft Industry 
On 26 April 1976, mandated by Government Act No. 15, in Jakarta, PT Industri Pesawat Terbang Nurtanio was officially established with BJ. Habibie as the President and CEO. The infrastructure was completed and inaugurated on 23 August 1976 by President Suharto. The new body was a merger between Nurtanio Aviation Industry Institution and Pertamina's Advanced Technology Division.

The name 'Nurtanio' is a tribute to Nurtanio Pringgoadisuryo, one of the first aviation pioneers in Indonesia, who designed the Sikumbang, an indigenous all metal aircraft (maiden flight: 1 August 1954). As a result of his death caused by a flight training accident on 1 March 1966, the Aviation Industry Preparation Agency was then renamed Nurtanio Aviation Industry Institution LLC.

Initially, IPTN manufactured the NBO 105 (MBB Bo 105) under license from MBB, followed by the NC 212 (CASA C-212 Aviocar), under license by CASA.

Nusantara Aircraft Industry 
Nusantara signifies the Indonesian 17,000 island archipelago.

The exclusion of "Nurtanio" from IPTN was due to some highly questionable accusations. One of the allegations was a personal use of company's letterhead by Nurtanio's family to appropriate some IPTN stocks. None was proven true.

Dirgantara Indonesia / Indonesian Aerospace 

Following the 1997 Asian financial crisis, a major restructuring program was implemented. At its peak, in 2004, the Indonesian Aerospace reduced its payroll from 9670 to 3720. Furthermore, the 18 business divisions were reorganised into the following:
 Aircraft
 Aircraft Services
 Aerostructure
 Defense
 Engineering Services

The restructuring focused on new business goals, downsizing and adaptation of man-power according to available workloads, and a pinpoint market targeting along with a concentrated business mission.

The IPTN was re-introduced as PT Dirgantara Indonesia (abbreviated DI) or Indonesian Aerospace (abbreviated IAe). IAe was officially inaugurated by the President of Indonesia, Abdurrahman Wahid, in Bandung on 24 August 2000.

On 4 July 2011 Indonesia's government said it will inject Rp.2 trillion ($234 million) to Indonesian Aerospace to keep the debt-ridden firm afloat with a view to making a joint venture with EADS. Before injection the unpaid debt to government was Rp.1.1 trillion ($129 million).

IAe Services 
 Engineering work packages; design, development, testing
 Manufacturing subcontracts
 Aircraft Maintenance Repair and Overhaul (MRO)
 Engine Maintenance and Overhaul (MRO)

IAe facilities 
Indonesian Aerospace covers an area of 86.98 ha. The backbone of the production is sustained by 232 high tech operations. Apart from these, there are other minor high-tech facilities spread over various assembly lines, laboratories, and service & maintenance units. They are located mainly in Bandung.

Products

Indonesian Aerospace and its precursors 
(PT Dirgantara Indonesia (DI) – (IAe) Indonesian Aerospace)

AURI 
( – Indonesian Air Force Research, Development, and Production Depot)
 NU-200 Sikumbang
 NU-225 Sikumbang (X-09)
 NU-260 Sikumbang (X-02)
 Belalang 85 (X-03) – converted Piper J-3 Cub
 Belalang 90 – converted Piper J-3 Cub
 Kunang 25 (X-04)
 Super Kunang 35 (X-05 and X-07)
 Kindjeng 150 (X-06)
 B-8m Kolentang – based on Bensen B-8

LIPNUR
(Lembaga Industri Penerbangan Nurtanio – Nurtanio Aviation Industry Institution)
 LIPNUR Gelatik (License-built PZL-104 Wilga)
 LIPNUR LT-200 Angkatang (License-built Pazmany PL-2)
 LIPNUR Belalang
 LIPNUR Kindjeng
 LIPNUR Kolentang
 LIPNUR Kumbang
 LIPNUR Kunang
 LIPNUR Kunang-kunang
 LIPNUR Manyang
 LIPNUR Sikumbang
 LIPNUR Super Kunang I
 LIPNUR Super Kunang II

IAe Aircraft production 
 CASA/IPTN CN-235 civil, military, and maritime version (Joint development with CASA under Aircraft Technology (Airtech)).
 Indonesian Aerospace CN-295 (Variant of C-295 made by Indonesian Aerospace).
 Indonesian Aerospace N-219 is a 19-seat commercial turboprop aircraft. First flew in August 2017, it was certified by Indonesian Directorate General of Civil Aviation in December 2020. IAe (PT DI) has received 257 orders of N-219 from abroad and domestic.
 Indonesian Aerospace N-245 is a planned 50-seat commercial turboprop aircraft. In mid 2018, IAe (PT DI) completed wind tunnel testing and finalize the design.
 Indonesian Aerospace N-250 is a 50-seat commercial turboprop aircraft. 2 prototypes have been built, but the program was discontinued due to 1997 Asian financial crisis that forced to stop the development. This program planned to be restarted in 2018 by the development of N-245 or R-80 aircraft program.
 Indonesian Aerospace N-2130 is a planned commercial jet aircraft, discontinued due to 1997 Asian financial crisis before making any prototype.
Indonesian Aerospace Elang Hitam is a medium-altitude long-endurance unmanned aerial vehicle currently being developed.

Joint Development & production aircraft
 KAI KF-X, Joint Development South Korea & Indonesia Government, with development cost sharing consisted of 20 percent Indonesian Government and 80 percent South Korea. KAI and IAe (PTDI) are appointed as System Integrator. KAI KF-X is a multirole fighter, more advanced than F-16 E/F but still below F-35. Currently in prototype development phase.

License-built aircraft
 NAS 330J, a licensed built Aérospatiale Puma helicopter, first made in 1981.
 NAS 332, a licensed built Eurocopter Super Puma helicopter, first made in 1983.
 Eurocopter EC725, 6 helicopters for Indonesian Air Force.
 NB 412, a licensed built Bell 412 helicopter made since 1984.
 NBO 105, a licensed built Bölkow Bo 105 helicopter, discontinued in July 2011 after 123 units production since 1976.
 NBK 117, a licensed built MBB/Kawasaki BK 117, first produced in 1981.
 Eurocopter Fennec as replacement of NBO 105 production line.
 Eurocopter Ecureuil as replacement of NBO 105 production line.
 NC-212, a licensed built CASA C-212 Aviocar aircraft.

IAe Armaments 
 FFAR 2.75 inch rocket under Belgium's license.
 SUT torpedo.
NDL-40 Ground-to-Ground Rocket Multi Launcher.
R-Han 122 rocket munition.
RN01-SS

Development products
Indonesian Aerospace has planned to build N-245 to carry 50 passengers for about 400 kilometres distance in remote areas or where passenger demand is low. The N-245 is only modification development of CN-235 body shape with CN-235 and EADS CASA C-295 wing designs, but the tail will be a new design. The development cost of N-245 until its prototype is about $150 million with its break even point of N-245 is only 50–70 aircraft, while if built from beginning it will cost $1.5–2.0 billion. The competitors are ATR 42 and Bombardier Dash 8 Q300.

See also
 Aviation in Indonesia
 Science and technology in Indonesia
 Philippine Aerospace Development Corporation
 Aerospace Industrial Development Corporation

References

External links 
 
 IPTN Profile from Industry Department
 Nurtanio reminiscences
 History of Indonesian Aviation

Defense companies of Indonesia
Aircraft manufacturers of Indonesia
Aviation in Indonesia
Companies based in Bandung
Technology companies established in 1976
Government-owned companies of Indonesia
Indonesian brands
Indonesian companies established in 1976
Aerospace companies of Asia
Aircraft manufacturers of Asia
Manufacturing companies established in 1976
Helicopter manufacturers